Yekta Jamali (born December 16, 2004 in Sedeh Lenjan, Isfahan) is an Iranian weightlifter who won a Bronze medal at the 2021 Junior World Championships in the 87 kg weight division. Her medal was Iran's first ever in the sport.

Major results

External links

References

2004 births
Living people
Iranian female weightlifters
Place of birth missing (living people)